Sparagovići  is a village in the Ston municipality, Dubrovnik-Neretva County, Croatia. It is connected by the D414 highway.

External links 

Populated places in Dubrovnik-Neretva County